Sarah Frances Whiting (August 23, 1847 – September 12, 1927) was an American physicist and astronomer. She was one of the founders and the first director of the Whitin Observatory at Wellesley College. She instructed several notable astronomers and physicists, including Annie Jump Cannon.

Biography
Whiting was interested from an early age in science by her father, who taught natural philosophy. Whiting graduated from Ingham University in 1865, after which she taught at a girls' secondary school in Brooklyn.

Whiting was appointed by Wellesley College president Henry Fowle Durant, one year after the College's 1875 opening, as its first professor of physics. She established its physics department and the undergraduate experimental physics lab at Wellesley, the second of its kind to be started in the country. 
At the request of Durant, she attended lectures at the Massachusetts Institute of Technology given by Edward Charles Pickering. Through attending Pickering's classes, Whiting observed the techniques of teaching science through laboratory work, which was then new to the United States. Whiting adopted this pedagogy for her own classes, and so established the second undergraduate physics laboratory in the United States, after MIT.

Pickering also invited Whiting to observe some of the new techniques being applied to astronomy, such as spectroscopy.
In 1880, Whiting started teaching a course of practical astronomy at Wellesley.

In February 1896, only a few weeks after the public announcement of the discovery of x-rays, Whiting conducted x-ray experiments with her students and other physics professors. She was among the first in the United States and likely the first woman to successfully replicate Wilhelm Röntgen's x-rays. As told by biographer and former student Annie Jump Cannon, 
An especially exciting moment came when the Boston morning papers reported the discovery of the Rontgen or X-rays in 1895. The advanced students in physics of those days will always remember the zeal with which Miss Whiting immediately set up an old Crookes tube and the delight when she actually obtained some of the very first photographs taken in this country of coins within a purse and bones within the flesh.In addition to Cannon, Whiting was also assisted or attended in the X-ray experiments by Mabel Augusta Chase and Grace Evangeline Davis. In these experiments, they played with the variables in the established set up to improve image quality and learn how x-rays could penetrate different materials. 
Between 1896 and 1900, Whiting helped Wellesley College trustee Sarah Elizabeth Whitin to establish the Whitin Observatory, of which Whiting became the first director.

During her time at Wellesley, Whiting kept up to date on scientific developments and shared the knowledge with her students. She met with Thomas Edison and learned of his incandescent bulbs. She then gave a demonstration at Wellesley of these bulbs to the board of trustees in the hopes of getting them to invest in the new technology. Additionally, she traveled and attended classes at universities all over the world and connected with scientists. 

Tufts College bestowed an honorary doctorate on Whiting in 1905.

Sarah Whiting was also known for supporting prohibition.

Whiting retired from her position as a professor of physics at Wellesley in 1916, but remained as Director of the Whitin Observatory until 1916. She held the title of Professor Emeritus until her death in 1927 in Wilbraham, Massachusetts. She is buried in Machpelah Cemetery in Le Roy, New York, near her now-defunct alma mater, Ingham University.

Writings

Whiting wrote the textbook Daytime and evening exercises in astronomy, for schools and colleges.

She was an author of several articles in popular astronomy, including: 
"Use of Graphs in Teaching Astronomy",
"Use of Drawings in Orthographic Projection and of Globes in Teaching Astronomy",
"Spectroscopic Work for Classes in Astronomy",
"The Use of Photographs in Teaching Astronomy",
"Partial Solar Eclipse, June 28, 1908",
Solar Halos,
"A Pedagogical Suggestion for Teachers of Astronomy",
"Priceless Accessions to Whitin Observatory Wellesley College",
"The Tulse Hill observatory diaries (abstract)",
"The Tulse Hill observatory diaries",
Whiting also wrote an obituary for Margaret Lindsay Huggins and reminiscences of William Thomson.

She described her experiences in physics in the Wellesley College News article "The experiences of a woman physicist."

Achievements 
Honors:
1883 Member, American Association for the Advancement of Science (AAAS)
1905 Honorary doctorate, Tufts College

Tenures:
1876–1912 Professor of Physics, Wellesley College
1900–1916 Director, Whitin Observatory, Wellesley College
1916–1927 Professor Emeritus, Wellesley College

Education:
AB Ingham University 1865

References

Further reading

External links
Brief biography of Sarah Whiting
Sarah Frances Whiting: A foremother of American women physicists
Women in Meteorology before World War II
Sarah Frances Whiting, at Wellesley College Archives
Sarah Frances Whiting at Women in Astronomy: A Comprehensive Bibliography

1847 births
1927 deaths
American women astronomers
American physicists
Wellesley College faculty
Massachusetts Institute of Technology alumni
Whitin Observatory